Beaster is the second EP by the band Sugar.

Beaster may also refer to:

 Beasters, cannabis
 Beasters, a fan of Becky G